Cynanchum elegans, the white-flowered wax plant, is a plant species in the genus Cynanchum found in New South Wales in Australia. It is a threatened species.

It was first described by George Bentham in 1868 as Vincetoxicum elegans, from two specimens: one collected by Woolls and the other by "Miss Scott" (either Helena or Harriet). It was assigned to the genus, Cynanchum, in 1928 by Karel Domin.

References

External sources

elegans
Flora of New South Wales
Plants described in 1928
Plants described in 1868
Taxa named by George Bentham